Nelson Arnoldo Rebolledo Tapia (born 14 November 1985) is a Chilean football defender who currently plays for Deportes Copiapó.

Rebolledo has also played for Cobreloa, Curicó Unido, San Luis Quillota and Huachipato. Among other data he scored against Colo-Colo in the Torneo Clausura 2008 at the Estadio Monumental in Santiago.

At some point also allegedly had been called to the Chile national football team.

Honours

Club
Universidad de Chile
Primera División de Chile (1): 2011–C
Copa Sudamericana (1): 2011

Deportes Iquique
Copa Chile (1): 2013–14

Curicó Unido
 Primera B (1): 2016–17

Santiago Wanderers
Primera B (1): 2019

External links
 

1985 births
Living people
Chilean footballers
Cobreloa footballers
San Luis de Quillota footballers
Curicó Unido footballers
C.D. Huachipato footballers
Universidad de Chile footballers
Deportes Iquique footballers
Santiago Wanderers footballers
Chilean Primera División players
Primera B de Chile players
Association football defenders
People from Rancagua